William David Maxwell More (1868 – 28 June 1902) was an English professional golfer and coach. More finished in fifth place in the 1891 Open Championship and took home £4 as his share of the purse. More carded rounds of 84-87=171, only five shots behind the 166 score posted by Hugh Kirkaldy who won the tournament.

Early life
William More was born in London, England, in 1868.

Golf career

1891 Open Championship
The 1891 Open Championship was held 6 October at the Old Course at St Andrews, Fife, Scotland. Hugh Kirkaldy was victorious by two strokes from his brother Andrew Kirkaldy and Willie Fernie. This was the last Open Championship contested in a single day over 36 holes. The 1892 Open was contested over 72 holes played on two successive days.

Death
More suffered from ill health and emigrated, firstly to South Africa and then to Australia where he died in 1902 at the age of 34.

References

English male golfers
Golfers from London
1868 births
1902 deaths